Godfried 'Frits' van den Boer (8 May 1934 – 6 August 2012) was a Belgian footballer who played for Anderlecht, Sint-Truidense and Royal Antwerp as well at the Belgium national team.

References

External links
 
 
 
 

1934 births
2012 deaths
Belgian footballers
R.S.C. Anderlecht players
Sint-Truidense V.V. players
Royal Antwerp F.C. players
Belgium international footballers
Association football forwards
People from Overpelt
Footballers from Limburg (Belgium)